Chvalčov is a municipality and village in Kroměříž District in the Zlín Region of the Czech Republic. It has about 1,600 inhabitants.

History
The first written mention of Chvalčov is from 1369.

Sights

The Hostýn hill, a Catholic pilgrimage site, lies in the municipal territory of Chvalčov. There is also the ruin of Obřany Castle on the eponymous hill.

References

Villages in Kroměříž District